The 1554 siege of Kiso-Fukushima was a siege by Takeda Shingen on Fukushima Castle, in the Kiso River Valley of Shinano province. This was one of many battles fought during Shingen's campaign to seize control of Shinano.

Kiso Yoshiyasu, commander of the besieged castle, surrendered as his garrison ran out of food and water, as a result of Shingen's starvation siege tactics.

References
Turnbull, Stephen (1998). 'The Samurai Sourcebook'. London: Cassell & Co.

Kiso-Fukushima
Kiso-Fukushima
1554 in Japan
Conflicts in 1554